Gabriel Omar Camarillo (born August 25, 1976) is an American attorney who has served as the 35th under secretary of the Army in the Biden administration since February 8, 2022. He previously served as Assistant Secretary of the Air Force (Manpower & Reserve Affairs) from 2015 to 2017 during the Obama administration.

Early life and education 
Camarillo was born and raised in El Paso, Texas and graduated from J. M. Hanks High School in 1994. He attended St. Mary's University for one year before transferring to Georgetown University. Camarillo earned a Bachelor of Arts degree from Georgetown in 1998 and a Juris Doctor from Stanford Law School in 2002.

Career 
In 1998 and 1999, Camarillo served as a legislative assistant for Congressman Cal Dooley. After graduating from law school, he was a litigation associate at Akin Gump Strauss Hauer & Feld from 2002 to 2005. He was an associate at the Sutton Law Firm in San Francisco from 2004 to 2009 and at the Kaufman Legal Group in Los Angeles from 2009 to 2010. Camarillo joined the United States Army as a civilian employee in 2010, serving as a special assistant until 2012. From 2012 to 2016, he served as principal deputy assistant secretary of the Army (acquisition, logistics & technology). From December 15, 2015, to January 22, 2017, he served as assistant secretary of the Air Force (manpower & reserve affairs). Camarillo then joined McKinsey & Company as a senior advisor. In 2017, he joined the Science Applications International Corporation.

Camarillo was nominated for United States Under Secretary of the Army in July 2021. He was confirmed by voice vote on February 2, 2022.

References 

|-

|-

1976 births
Living people
People from El Paso, Texas
St. Mary's University, Texas alumni
Georgetown University alumni
Stanford Law School alumni
Obama administration personnel
United States Under Secretaries of the Army
McKinsey & Company people
Biden administration personnel